The pale-headed snake (Hoplocephalus bitorquatus) is a species of venomous snake in the family Elapidae. The species is endemic to Australia.

Taxonomy
The species was originally described as Alecto bitorquata by Giorgio Jan in 1859.

Description
The top of the head is pale olive, with a bright yellow occipital blotch, which is edged with black. The body is dark olive dorsally, and may have a darker vertebral streak. Ventrally, it is greyish olive or brown.

Distribution and habitat
H. bitorquatus is found on the eastern coast of Australia, from Cape York Peninsula in Queensland to Gosford in New South Wales. The preferred natural habitat of H. bitorquatus is forest.

Behaviour
H. bitorquatus is arboreal.

Diet
H. bitorquatus preys predominantly upon tree frogs, but also eats small lizards and small mammals.

Reproduction
H. bitorquatus is viviparous.

References

Further reading
 Cogger HG (2014). Reptiles and Amphibians of Australia, Seventh Edition. Clayton, Victoria, Australia: CSIRO Publishing. xxx + 1,033 pp. .
 Wilson S, Swan G (2013). A Complete Guide to Reptiles of Australia, Fourth Edition. Sydney: New Holland Publishers. 522 pp. .

Reptiles of Queensland
Reptiles of New South Wales
Hoplocephalus
Reptiles described in 1859
Snakes of Australia